The Exo Chambly-Richelieu-Carignan sector was formed in 1984 to provide public transit service to the communities of Chambly, Richelieu and Carignan. In 1993 it was agreed to expand service to St-Mathias-sur-Richelieu, and in 1994 it was the turn of Marieville to join.

Gestrans was contracted to manage the transportation system from 2008 through 2012 with Veolia Transport (formerly Connex) operating the buses, under an agreement that expired at the end of 2011.

Services
Most bus routes terminate either at Longueuil or at the downtown Montreal bus terminal via a reserved bus lane on the Champlain Bridge. Both locations provide a connection with local bus services or the Montreal Metro. There are local taxibus routes in Carignan.

Bus routes

See also 
 Exo (public transit) bus services

References

External links
 AMT site for CIT Chambly-Richelieu-Carignan
 Transit History of Montreal suburbs, Conseil Intermunicipal de Transport (CIT)

Transit agencies in Quebec
Bus transport in Quebec
Transport in Montérégie
Chambly, Quebec
Transport in Saint-Jean-sur-Richelieu
1984 establishments in Quebec
La Vallée-du-Richelieu Regional County Municipality
Rouville Regional County Municipality